Catene may refer to:

 Catene (album), a 1984 album by Italian singer Mina
 Catene (1925 film), a 1925 Italian film
 Catene (1949 film), a 1949 Italian film
 Catene (1974 film), a 1974 Italian film
 Catene invisibili, a 1942 Italian film